Minnesota State Highway 284 (MN 284) is a  highway in Minnesota, which runs from its intersection with U.S. Highway 212 in Cologne and continues to its northern terminus at its intersection with State Highway 5 in Waconia.

Route description
Highway 284 serves as a north–south route between Cologne and Waconia.

The roadway is also known as Paul Avenue and Benton Street in the city of Cologne.

The route passes around the east side of Benton Lake in Cologne.

The route is legally defined as Route 284 in the Minnesota Statutes.

History
Highway 284 was authorized on July 1, 1949.

The route was paved at the time it was marked.

Major intersections

References

External links

Highway 284 at the Unofficial Minnesota Highways Page

284
Transportation in Carver County, Minnesota